Jia Qing Wilson-Yang is a Canadian writer; her debut novel Small Beauty was published in 2016.

She was awarded an honour of distinction from the Dayne Ogilvie Prize in 2016, and won the Lambda Literary Award for Transgender Fiction at the 29th Lambda Literary Awards in 2017. Her writing has also appeared in the anthologies Bound to Struggle: Where Kink and Radical Politics Meet and Letters Lived: Radical Reflections, Revolutionary Paths, and in the literary magazine Room.

References

External links
 

21st-century Canadian novelists
Canadian women novelists
Canadian LGBT novelists
Transgender novelists
Transgender women
Canadian people of Chinese descent
Canadian writers of Asian descent
Lambda Literary Award winners
Writers from Ontario
Living people
21st-century Canadian women writers
Year of birth missing (living people)
21st-century Canadian LGBT people